Eindawthe was a wife of Prince Zeya Theinkha (later King Htilominlo). She was the mother of Regent Naratheinga Uzana (r.  1231–35) and King Kyaswa (r. 1235–51). She was a great granddaughter of King Sithu I.

She died a week after giving birth to Kyaswa. Since Kyaswa was born on 4 May 1198, she died on 11 May 1198.

References

Bibliography
 
 
 
 

Pagan dynasty
12th-century Burmese women